Richard William Herrick  (3 December 1913 - 5 May 1981) was an Anglican priest. He was educated at King Edward VI School Retford and Leeds University and was initially a civil servant. He was  ordained after a period of study at the  College of the Resurrection, Mirfield in 1940. He held curacies at Duston and Portsea, Portsmouth before being appointed Vicar of St Michael's, Northampton in 1947, a post he held for a decade. He was then a Canon Residentiary of Chelmsford Cathedral until 1978 when he was appointed Provost of Chelmsford. He died in post.

Notes

1913 births
People educated at King Edward VI Grammar School, Retford
Alumni of the University of Leeds
Alumni of the College of the Resurrection
Provosts and Deans of Chelmsford
1981 deaths
20th-century English Anglican priests